The Dewey Loeffel Landfill is an EPA superfund site located in Rensselaer County, New York. In the 1950s and 1960s, several companies including General Electric, Bendix Corporation and Schenectady Chemicals used the site as a disposal facility for more than 46,000 tons of industrial hazardous wastes, including solvents, waste oils, polychlorinated biphenyls (PCBs), scrap materials, sludges and solids.  Some hazardous substances, including volatile organic compounds (VOCs) and PCBs, have migrated from the facility to underlying aquifers and downstream surface water bodies, resulting in contamination of groundwater, surface water, sediments and several species of fish. There is currently a ban on fish consumption in Nassau Lake and the impacted tributaries. Site investigations are underway to determine the nature and extent of the contamination and inform the development of permanent cleanup options for the site.

In 1986, Schenectady Chemicals agreed that it would pay $496,500 toward the cleanup effort.

References

Environmental disasters in the United States
Geography of Rensselaer County, New York
Superfund sites in New York (state)
Rensselaer County, New York
Waste disposal incidents in the United States